= Jean-Bernard Lévy (football) =

Jean-Bernard Lévy (9 March 1897 – 16 May 1940) was a French football functionary. With the beginning of professional football in France in 1932, he became the first president of Racing Club de France (RCF) as one of the founding clubs of the French professional league (see Ligue 1#Establishment).

In 1932, Lévy who was a member of RCF committee as well as the Commission du Championnat de France professionnel (Commission of French Professional Championship) stood at the beginnings of the professional football section of the Racing Club de France which adopted the name of its home sports society as Racing Club de France.

In November of 1935 Levy invited the Moscow city football team as the best football team of the Soviet Union to Paris. To Paris departed two Muscovite teams from Russian sports societies Spartak and Dynamo. That particular event became very notable for the Soviet football and emphasized as being an influential in creation of professional football competition that started in 1936.

Few days after the Coupe de France final in which RCF beat Olympique de Marseille 2–1 at Parc des Princes, Lévy perished at the Battle of France as a French soldier.
